Apricot Princess is the second studio album by English recording artist Rex Orange County. It was released on 26 April 2017.

Track listing
All tracks written and produced by Alex "Rex Orange County" O'Connor, except where noted.

Personnel

 Rex Orange County – production (all tracks), programming (tracks 1–4, 6, 9, 10), string arrangement (tracks 1, 4, 6, 10), guitars (tracks 2, 7, 9, 10), keyboards (track 2, 9, 10), drums (tracks 1, 9), piano (tracks 7, 8), percussion (track 1), bass (track 7)
 Ben Baptie – production (track 6), recording engineering (tracks 1–4, 6, 8–10), mix engineering (all tracks)
 Michael Uzowuru – production (track 7)
 Jeff Kleinman – production (track 7), keyboards (track 7), bass (track 7), recording engineering (track 7)
 Two Inch Punch – production (track 9), recording engineering (tracks 5, 8, 9)
 Marco McKinnis – feature vocals (track 3)
 Thea Morgan-Murrell – feature vocals (track 4), additional vocals (track 1)
 Joe MacLaren – double bass (tracks 1, 4) electric bass (tracks 1, 3, 6, 9)
 Mike Underwood – saxophone (track 8)
 Haydn Bendall – organ (track 10), string arrangement (track 6), recording engineering (tracks 1, 4, 6, 10)
 Tom Pigott Smith – violin (tracks 1, 4, 6, 10)
 Alison Dods – violin (tracks 1, 4, 6, 10)
 Calina de la Mare – violin (tracks 1, 4, 6, 10)
 Peter Hanson – violin (tracks 1, 4, 6, 10)
 Reiad Chibah – viola (tracks 1, 4, 6, 10)
 Danny Keane – viola (tracks 1, 4, 6, 10)
 Ian Burdge – cello (tracks 1, 4, 6, 10)
 Danny Keane – cello (tracks 1, 4, 6, 10)
 John Davis – mastering engineering

Charts

Certifications

References

2017 albums
Rex Orange County albums
Self-released albums
Albums produced by Michael Uzowuru